Montaldo Bormida is a comune (municipality) in the Province of Alessandria in the Italian region Piedmont, located about  southeast of Turin and about  south of Alessandria.

As part of the Marquisate of Montferrat, Montaldo Bormida had a succession of feudal lords: the Della Valle family of Trisobbio, the Ferraris of Orsara, the Centurione, Spinola and Pallavicino families.

Montaldo Bormida borders the following municipalities: Carpeneto, Orsara Bormida, Rivalta Bormida, Sezzadio, and Trisobbio.
 
The first Seventh-day Adventist Church in Italy was built in Montaldo Bormida in 1925.

References

Cities and towns in Piedmont